Raymond or Ray Burke may refer to:
Raymond Burke (clarinetist) (1904–1986), New Orleans jazz clarinetist
Raymond H. Burke (1881–1954), United States politician from Ohio
Raymond Leo Burke (born 1948), American Roman Catholic prelate
Raymond Burke (priest) (died 1562), Irish priest
Ray Burke (Irish politician) (Raphael Patrick Burke, born 1943), Irish politician